The Mosquito River is a  stream in Alger County in the Upper Peninsula of Michigan, United States. It is a tributary of Lake Superior along the Pictured Rocks National Lakeshore.

See also
List of rivers of Michigan

References

Michigan  Streamflow Data from the USGS

Rivers of Michigan
Rivers of Alger County, Michigan
Tributaries of Lake Superior